Today Is the Day is an EP by Yo La Tengo, released in 2003 on Matador Records. The title track is a rock version of a song from the album Summer Sun.

The EP features a cover of the song “Needle of Death” by Bert Jansch. The album artwork imitates the artwork for Ornette Coleman’s Something Else!!!!.

In popular culture
The song "Today Is the Day" is featured in the video game Major League Baseball 2K6.

Track listing
 "Today Is the Day (Rock Version)" - 4:26
 "Styles of the Times" - 4:19
 "Outsmartener" - 2:56
 "Needle of Death" (Bert Jansch cover) - 3:18
 "Dr. Crash" - 2:37
 "Cherry Chapstick" - 5:31

References

2003 EPs
Yo La Tengo albums